South China Sea shipwrecks may refer to:

 Nanhai One, a Song dynasty ship sometimes called South China Sea-I (via translation of "Nanhai")
 Nan'ao One, a Ming dynasty ship previously called South China Sea-II 
 Shipwrecks found in the South China Sea